Cherson (or Kherson) may refer to the following places and jurisdictions :

 Kherson, a city in southern Ukraine, the administrative center of the Kherson Oblast (province)
 Chersonesus Taurica, an ancient Greek colony founded approximately 2,500 years ago in the southwestern part of Crimea
 Cherson (theme), a Byzantine military province located in the southern Crimea, centred at Chersonesus Taurica
 the former Roman Catholic Diocese of Cherson (renamed Tiraspol), in and around post-Soviet Moldavia
 2701 Cherson, a main-belt asteroid discovered on 1 September 1978 by Nikolai Chernykh